Freshen Up was a chewing gum with flavored gels inside manufactured by Cadbury Adams in Brazil. Current flavours  include cinnamon, peppermint, spearmint and bubble gum. A fruit variation was offered in the 1970s.

History
The product was launched in 1975. In 2019, the product was discontinued by the manufacturer.

Factory explosion
In 1976 an explosion of the Freshen Up gum manufacturing line at the American Chicle factory in Queens, New York killed six workers. The New York State Supreme Court justice in Queens dismissed the manslaughter and homicide charges against the Warner-Lambert Company and the four executives the following year.

References

Chewing gum
Products introduced in 1975
Cadbury Adams brands
Mondelez International brands